Pirgol (also Romanized as Pīrgol) is a village in Anzal-e Jonubi Rural District, Anzal District, Urmia County, West Azerbaijan Province, Iran. At the 2006 census, its population was 257 people, including 50 families.

References 

Populated places in Urmia County